James C. Caroline (January 17, 1933 – November 17, 2017) was an American professional football player in the National Football League (NFL) and Canadian Football League (CFL).  He played college football at the University of Illinois at Urbana–Champaign where he was a consensus All-American in 1953. After a year in the CFL with the Toronto Argonauts and Montreal Alouettes, Caroline played for ten seasons in the NFL with the Chicago Bears. He is a member of the College Football Hall of Fame.

Playing career
Caroline played college football at the Illinois, lettering in 1953 and 1954.  A halfback, Caroline led the nation in rushing with 1256 yards in 1953 as a sophomore, and was named All-American. The next year, he was ruled ineligible to play due to academic reasons, so instead of returning to college his senior year, Caroline chose to play Canadian football.

He initially signed with the Toronto Argonauts for $15,000 and played with them through September. They then stunned the league when he was placed on waivers;  head coach Bill Swiacki, claimed he wasn’t good enough as a defensive back. The only team that could afford him was the division champion Montreal Alouettes. Caroline rushed for 575 yards on the season.  He played in the 1955 Grey Cup game. Following that year, Caroline earned a physical education degree from Florida A&M University and was drafted by the Chicago Bears with the 82nd overall pick in the 1956 NFL Draft .

Beginning in 1956, Caroline had a ten-year career with the Bears.  Playing primarily defensive back, Caroline finished his career with 24 interceptions and six total touchdowns—two rushing, one receiving, one fumble recovery, and two on interceptions. Caroline intercepted Johnny Unitas's first NFL career pass attempt and returned it for a touchdown. He was a two-way player for the Bears' 1956 Western Conference champions and a DB on the 1963 NFL Championship team.

Honors and later life
After his professional football career, Caroline moved to Urbana, Illinois coached the Urbana High School football team in 1982 and taught physical education at Urbana Middle School.

Caroline was inducted into the College Football Hall of Fame in 1980.

He was portrayed by actor Bernie Casey in the 1971 biopic Brian's Song.

His grandson Jordan Caroline is a basketball player at Nevada. J.C. Caroline died in 2017.

See also
 List of college football yearly rushing leaders

References

External links
 

1933 births
2017 deaths
American football defensive backs
American football halfbacks
Chicago Bears players
Illinois Fighting Illini football players
Montreal Alouettes players
Toronto Argonauts players
High school football coaches in Illinois
All-American college football players
College Football Hall of Fame inductees
Western Conference Pro Bowl players
Florida A&M University alumni
People from Warrenton, Georgia
Players of American football from Georgia (U.S. state)
African-American players of American football
African-American players of Canadian football
20th-century African-American sportspeople
21st-century African-American people